The Black Hole is an album by Misty's Big Adventure, released in 2005. It is their second full studio release and contained the single "The Story Of Love".

Track listing
"The Black Hole" - 4:37
"Never Stops Never Rests Never Sleeps" - 2:59
"The Story Of Love" - 3:19
"Smart Guys Wear Ties" - 2:52
"Evil" - 2:44
"She Fills The Spaces" - 2:44
"Everything's Odd" - 1:53
"Dark Matter No.1" - 1:24
"Elevator Escalator Stairs" - 3:15
"Microwave" - 3:07
"I'm Waiting For You" - 2:04
"It's Not That Important" - 2:46
"There's A Lot Going On In My Mind" - 3:46
"Dark Matter No.2" - 1:53
"The Wising Up Song" - 5:09

External links 
[ The Black Hole at allmusic.com]

2005 albums
Misty's Big Adventure albums